Julius Wilford "Nicky" Arnstein (born Arndstein; July 1, 1879October 2, 1965) was an American professional gambler and con artist. He was known primarily as Julius Arnold, but among his aliases were "Jules Arndtsteyn", "Nick Arnold," "Nicholas Arnold",  "Wallace Ames", "John Adams", and "J. Willard Adair". He was best known as the second husband of entertainer Fanny Brice.

Life and career
Arnstein was born Julius Arndstein in Berlin, German Empire. His father, Moses Arndstein, was a German Jew from Berlin who fought in the Franco-Prussian War. His mother, born Thekla van Shaw, was Dutch. The couple raised their children in the Episcopal Church.  First settling in New Jersey, the couple had two other children besides middle-child Nicky; son Louis (born 1877), and daughter Gesina (born 1883).

"Nicky" was short for nickel plate, a sobriquet bestowed in the 1890s when, as a boy, Arnstein rode a gleaming nickel-plated bicycle in the then-popular bike racing craze. However, he spent more time throwing races than winning them. He graduated to gambling on transatlantic liners and in European casinos, and eventually fell in with Arnold Rothstein, a loan shark, bookmaker, fence, Wall Street swindler, real estate speculator, and labor racketeer, who was best known for fixing the 1919 World Series.

In 1915, Arnstein was convicted of swindling, and the following year he entered Sing Sing to serve out his term. Fanny Brice visited him every week while he was there, and in 1918 Arnstein's wife Carrie sued her for alienation of his affection. She subsequently divorced him, leaving him free to marry Brice in October of that year.

Arnstein and Brice had two children, daughter Frances Arnstein Stark (1919-1992) and son William Arnstein (1921-2008), a graphic artist later known professionally as William Brice.

On May 16, 1924, having been convicted of conspiracy to carry stolen securities into the District of Columbia, Arnstein entered Leavenworth prison, where he remained for three years. Brice divorced him on September 17, 1927, soon after his release.

Arnstein remained out of trouble for the rest of his life. He lived long enough to see himself immortalized in the 1964 Broadway musical Funny Girl, in which he was portrayed by Sydney Chaplin. In the musical, Arnstein is found guilty of embezzlement, has never been married to anyone but Fanny, and serves only one prison sentence – after being married for several years. Omar Sharif assumed the role in the 1968 film and its 1975 sequel, Funny Lady.

References

Further reading
Rothstein: The Life, Times, and Murder of the Criminal Genius Who Fixed the 1919 World Series by David Pietrusza, published by Carroll & Graf, New York, New York

External links

1879 births
1965 deaths
American confidence tricksters
American gamblers
American people convicted of fraud
American people of German-Jewish descent
American people of Dutch descent
American Episcopalians 
German emigrants to the United States
People from Berlin